CcMmYK, sometimes referred to as CMYKLcLm or CMYKcm, is a six-color printing process used in some inkjet printers optimized for photo printing. It complements the more common four color CMYK process, which stands for Cyan, Magenta, Yellow and Key (black), by adding light cyan and light magenta. Individually, light cyan is often abbreviated to Lc or c, and light magenta is represented as Lm or m.

Advantages of CcMmYK over CMYK 

The most noticeable result of using light cyan and light magenta inks is the removal of a distinct and harsh halftone or dither dot appearance that appears in prints that use light shades of cyan or magenta on the pure CMYK ink configuration. Usually when printing a dark color the printer will saturate the area with colored ink dots, but will use fewer ink dots to create the effect of a light color. The result is hard to notice with yellow because yellow is perceived as a very light color. However, the individual cyan and magenta ink dots will stand out in a sparse pattern due to their darker color against a white background; the result is undesirable when it is noticed.

By using light cyan or magenta, the printer can saturate areas that would typically use halftoning with these inks to remove the look of sparse magenta and cyan dots. The downside is the printer needs approximately twice as much light cyan and magenta ink in areas to achieve the same saturation as pure cyan/magenta which can lead to excess ink usage. The result, however, is significantly better for some photos.

CcMmYK colorants reduce graininess in the middle tone region.  This reduced graininess typically improves the photographic appearance of blue skies and some flesh tones.

References

Color space
Printing terminology